Sir Richard Garth PC QC (11 May 1820 – 23 March 1903) was Member of Parliament for Guildford from 1866 to 1868 and Chief Justice of Bengal from 1875 to 1886.

Early life
Garth was born Richard Lowndes at Morden, Surrey (now south-west London), the son of the Reverend Richard Lowndes (1790 – 30 January 1862) and his wife Mary Lowndes (née Douglas).
Rev. Lowndes was, through his mother, the grandson of Richard Garth (d. 1787), Lord of the Manor of Morden. On the death of his mother, the Rev. Lowndes inherited the manor and, in accordance with the requirements of his grandfather's will, he changed his and his family's surname to Garth by royal licence in 1837.

Garth was educated at Eton College and matriculated at Christ Church, Oxford in 1838, graduating B.A. in 1842 and M.A. in 1845. He was captain of the university cricket team in 1840 and 1841. He also played cricket for Marylebone Cricket Club, Hampshire and Surrey between 1839 and 1844. He received his MA from Oxford in June 1845.

A student at Lincoln's Inn from 1842, he became a barrister there on 19 November 1847. When his father died in 1862, Garth inherited the manor and its estate at Morden Hall. Garth sold the manor in about 1872. He was also instrumental in the early planning of parts of Raynes Park, on land he owned in the neighbouring parish of Merton.

Garth practised commercial law in London, often appearing at the Guildhall. On 23 July 1866, Garth was made a Queen's Counsel and, two days later, became a bencher of Lincoln's Inn. At a by-election on 17 December 1866, he became one of the two members of parliament for Guildford, Surrey, replacing Sir William Bovill. His period as an MP ended at the 1868 general election when, as a consequence of the 1867 Reform Act, Guildford's second parliamentary seat was abolished.

In India
On 2 March 1875, Garth was made Chief Justice of Bengal. He received a knighthood on 13 May 1875. Garth's legal opinions often brought him into conflict with the Indian and Bengal administrations, particularly with the Viceroy, the Marquess of Ripon, over the Bengal Tenancy Act and the Criminal Procedure Code Amendment Bill (the Ilbert Bill), both of which Garth publicly opposed. In May 1883, Garth sentenced Surendranath Banerjea to two months' imprisonment for libel against another of the high court's judges. He remained in the post at Fort William, Calcutta until 26 February 1886.

Although he had opposed legislation which would have brought the legal rights of whites and Indians closer together, Garth was a supporter of the Indian National Congress and, in 1888, wrote a pamphlet A Few Plain Truths about India in support of the organisation's aims stating, "for myself I have long been persuaded that many of the abuses complained of are real and serious; and that some of the proposed reforms would be not only of advantage to India, but would materially strengthen the hands of the Government."

Later life and death
On 21 February 1888, Garth was appointed a Privy Counsellor. He died on 23 March 1903 at 10 Cheniston Gardens, Kensington.

Family
On 27 June 1847, Garth married his cousin Clara Lowndes, (1824–1903).

The Garths had seven children:
Richard Garth, b. 1848
George Douglas Garth, 1852–1900
William Garth, b. 1854
Charles Garth, b. 1870
Mary Eliza Garth, d. 1932
Helen Frances Garth
Evelyn Selina May Garth

References

External links 
 

1820 births
1903 deaths
Members of the Parliament of the United Kingdom for English constituencies
Knights Bachelor
UK MPs 1865–1868
Members of the Privy Council of the United Kingdom
People from Morden
History of the London Borough of Merton
People educated at Eton College
Alumni of Christ Church, Oxford
English barristers
Members of Lincoln's Inn
British India judges
Hampshire cricketers
Surrey cricketers
Oxford University cricketers
English cricketers of 1826 to 1863
Politics of Guildford
Marylebone Cricket Club cricketers
Gentlemen of England cricketers
Chief Justices of the Calcutta High Court